The ChungYuet Royal Landmark is a residential skyscraper complex located in Taoyuan District, Taoyuan, Taiwan. The complex contains 229 apartment units.

As of December 2020, they are the tallest buildings in Taoyuan, and 54th tallest in Taiwan.

Gallery

See also 
 List of tallest buildings in Asia
 List of tallest buildings in Taiwan
 List of tallest buildings in Taoyuan City
 Taoyuan Zhongzheng Arts and Cultural Business District
 ChungYuet Global Business Building
 ChungYuet World Center
 Gallery & Palace

References

External links

 Official Website of ChungYuet Royal Landmark

2012 establishments in Taiwan
Residential skyscrapers in Taiwan
Skyscrapers in Taoyuan
Buildings and structures in Taoyuan City
Apartment buildings in Taiwan
Residential buildings completed in 2012
Neoclassical architecture in Taiwan